Scott Wills (born 1971) is a New Zealand actor who has starred in several films and has also appeared on television and theatre. He won twice the prize of the best actor in New Zealand film and television awards.

Life and career
Wills studied at Massey University in Palmerston North and completed a Bachelor of Arts in English and Media Studies in 1992. Then he attended the Toi Whakaari for two years, graduation with a Diploma in Acting in 1994. He had his start on television in 1992 with an appearance in the soap opera Shortland Street, playing Philip Cotton, who had an obsession with Alison Raynor. In 1997, he was awarded the Chapman Tripp Best Newcomer award for his role in Mojo.

In 2000, he is named for New Zealand Film Award of the best actor in a supporting role for his role in the romantic comedy Hopeless. In 2001 he starred in his first major film, Stickmen, a comedy that achieved commercial success in New Zealand and for which he won the New Zealand Film Award of the best actor. He returned to television in different TV series and, in 2006, he co-starred in Perfect Creature. In 2008, he won his second New Zealand Film Award for best actor for his role in Apron Strings, a familial drama. In 2009, he played the Head of Security of a mysterious cult in the TV series The Cult. In 2013, he staged his first play, Bus Stop.

Filmography

Film
 1997 - The Ugly as Simon's victim
 2000 - Hopeless as Phil
 2001 - Stickmen as Wayne
 2005 - Boogeyman as Co-worker
 2006 - Perfect Creature as Det. Jones
 2008 - Apron Strings as Barry

TV work
 1992 - Shortland Street - Philip Cotton
 1999 - Duggan - Const. Kendrick
 2002 - Street Legal - Johnny Watts
 2004 - Power Rangers Dino Thunder - Termitetron (voice)
 2005 - Interrogation - Detective Constable Terry Skinner
 2006 - Doves of War (mini-series) - Brad McKecknie
 2008 - Burying Brian - Warren
 2008 - Legend of the Seeker - Briggs
 2009 - The Cult - Saul
 2010 - Stolen (TV movie) - Detective Inspector Stuart Wildon
 2011 - Underbelly NZ: Land Of The Long Green Cloud - Detective Clive Pilborough
 2012 - Safe House (TV movie) - D.C Lewis
 2013 - Power Rangers Megaforce - Distractor/Rico the Robot (voices)
 2015 - Power Rangers Dino Charge - Gold Digger (voice)
 2016 - Power Rangers Dino Super Charge - Spell Digger/Gold Digger (voices)
 2018 - Power Rangers Super Ninja Steel - Putrid (voice)

References

External links

1971 births
Living people
New Zealand male film actors
New Zealand male television actors
New Zealand male soap opera actors
20th-century New Zealand male actors
21st-century New Zealand male actors
Toi Whakaari alumni